Stewardship in the sense of caring management or leadership may refer to:

Stewardship
Stewardship (theology)

Specifically, it may refer to: 

Data steward
Environmental stewardship
Nuclear stockpile stewardship
Product stewardship

See also
Steward (disambiguation)